The 648th Maneuver Enhancement Brigade is a major subordinate command of the Georgia Army National Guard.

History
The 648th MEB started with an initial staffing of just 12 personnel, a headquarters company, and the 348th Brigade Support Battalion, home-stationed in Ellenwood, Georgia, and the 620th Signal Company, stationed in Weston, WV. There are currently 21 MEBs in the nation – two in the active component (expected to deactivate in September 2016) and 19 in the reserve component. 16 belong to the Army National Guard.

Since its activation, the 648th MEB added Augusta's 878th Engineer Battalion and Elberton's 1st Battalion, 214th Field Artillery Regiment. During deployments to the War in Iraq and War in Afghanistan, the brigade's force structure included elements from Marietta's 248th Medical Company and Georgia's military police and engineer battalions. At its peak deployed strength, the brigade's provided mission command to approximately 3,000 personnel from five battalions.

On August 8, 2010, the unit changed command for the first time. Colonel Keith Knowlton, turned over the unit to his successor, Colonel Andy Hall. COL Hall led the Brigade headquarters during its deployment to Kabul, Afghanistan in 2012. Prior to the unit's deployment, the 170th Military Police Battalion and the 1st Battalion, 214th Field Artillery Regiment were reorganized under the 78th Troop Command.

On March 16, 2013, the unit again changed command and Colonel Randal Scott Carter became the third commander of the 648th MEB and Command Sergeant Major John Scott Rainwater took responsibility of the brigade as the fourth Senior Enlisted Adviser in the brigade's history.

The brigade is authorized over 1,600 Soldiers and has enduring training and support relationships with 2nd Infantry Division (United States) in Korea and III Corps (United States) at Fort Hood, Texas.

Mission 
The mission of the 648th Maneuver Enhancement Brigade (MEB) is to provide manned, ready, and fully equipped mission-capable units to the Governor of the State of Georgia and to combatant and joint task force commanders to conduct support area operations, maneuver support operations, and support to consequence management and stability operations in order to assure the mobility, protection, and freedom of action of the supported force.

Deployments
2009: the 810th Engineer Company deployed to Afghanistan in support of Operation Enduring Freedom, clearing routes so coalition units could complete their missions unharmed and on time.

2010: the 190th Military Police Company deployed to Bagram Air Base near Kabul, Afghanistan. The company's primary job was to provide security for the base detention center along its guard towers and various entry control points.  The unit later picked up the additional task of escorting detainees to and from the center; and the 190th served as part of the base's immediate response force, protecting the area in which it resided in the event of an attack.

2011: the 877th Engineer Company deployed to Afghanistan in support of Operation Enduring Freedom. Upon their redeployment in 2012, they moved from under the 878th Engineer Battalion to 78th Troop Command.

2012:
The 648th MEB Headquarters Company deployed to Kabul, Afghanistan as Task Force Hydra.  During pre-deployment training, the brigade's organic network signal company, the 620th Signal Company (WVARNG), fully participated in a regional training exercise at Camp Blanding, FL. Task Force Hydra was responsible for the Kabul Base Cluster, providing mission command, security and support operations for the nearly 9,000 U.S. and coalition forces operating in the capital region.  They provided Garrison Command, CERP missions, Police Assistance Teams and construction management for the Kabul region.

The 878th Engineer Battalion headquarters and the 848th Engineer Company (Sapper) deployed to Kandahar, Afghanistan.

2013: the 1st Battalion 214th Field Artillery Regiment deployed to Shindand, Afghanistan as Task Force Granite.  Task Force Granite was responsible for base security for Shindand Air Base. They provided Base Security Battalion Command,  and carried out patrol and assessment missions, checkpoint control and flight line security for the base.  Responsibility for administrative control of the 1-214 FA BN was transferred from the 78th Troop Command to the 648th in June 2013 while the artillery battalion was deployed.

2014: The 876th Engineer Company deployed to Afghanistan in support of structural maintenance and repair in bases and camps throughout Afghanistan. They are expected to redeploy home in early 2015.

Leadership & Organization

Current Task Organization 
 Headquarters and Headquarters Company (HHC), 648th Maneuver Enhancement Brigade (648th MEB), Fort Benning, Georgia.
 348th Brigade Support Battalion (348th BSB), Ellenwood, Georgia.
1160th Transportation Company, Rome, Georgia
878th Engineer Battalion, Augusta, Georgia.
1st Battalion, 214th Field Artillery Regiment (1-214th FAR), Elberton, Georgia.
420th Signal Company, Cumming, Georgia.

Campaign Streamers and Unit Awards

References

External links 
 Georgia Department of Defense Official Website
 648th MEB Facebook Page
 648th MEB Flickr Page

Maneuver Enhancement Brigades of the United States Army
Military units and formations established in 2007